The following radio stations broadcast on AM frequency 1100 kHz: 1100 AM is a United States clear-channel frequency. WTAM in Cleveland, Ohio is the dominant Class A station on 1100 AM.

Argentina
 Estilo in Longchamps, Buenos Aires
 Mitre in Corrientes

Chile
CB110 at Viña del mar

Mexico
  in Bahía Asunción, Baja California Sur
  in Ometepec, Guerrero
  in Guadalupe Victoria, Zacatecas

United States
Stations in bold are clear-channel stations.

References

Lists of radio stations by frequency